The Road to Bresson is a 1984 Dutch documentary film directed by Leo De Boer and Jurriën Rood. It was screened in the Un Certain Regard section at the 1984 Cannes Film Festival.

Cast
 Robert Bresson as himself
 Louis Malle as himself
 Dominique Sanda as herself
 Paul Schrader as himself
 Andrei Tarkovsky as himself
 Orson Welles as himself

See also
 Orson Welles filmography

References

External links

1984 films
1980s Dutch-language films
1980s French-language films
1980s English-language films
1980s short documentary films
Dutch short documentary films
Dutch black-and-white films
1984 documentary films
1984 short films
1984 multilingual films
Dutch multilingual films